The Lieutenant Governor's Award for Literary Excellence is administered by the BC Book Prizes and recognizes a writer who has contributed significantly to the development of literary excellence in British Columbia, as well as having written a substantial body of literary work throughout his or her career.

The recipient receives a cash award of $5,000 and a commemorative certificate.

History

The Lieutenant Governor’s Award for Literary Excellence was first conceived in the spring of 2002. Led by the late Carol Shields, a group of respected BC writers met with the current Lieutenant Governor of British Columbia, the Honourable Iona Campagnolo to initiate a special provincial literary arts award. Inspired by Shields, this meeting resulted in the establishment of the Lieutenant Governor’s Award for Literary Excellence.

Winners
2004 - P. K. Page
2005 - Robert Bringhurst
2006 - Jack Hodgins
2007 - Patrick Lane
2008 - Gary Geddes
2009 - Terry Glavin
2010 - Stan Persky
2011 - George Bowering
2012 - Brian Brett
2013 - Lorna Crozier and Sarah Ellis
2014 - Kit Pearson
2015 - Betty Keller
2016 - Alan Twigg
2017 - Douglas Coupland
2020 - Julie Flett and Joy Kogawa
2021 - Joseph A. Dandurand

References

Sources
Lieutenant Governor's Award for Literary Excellence, official website
BC Book Prizes

BC and Yukon Book Prizes
2004 establishments in Canada
Awards established in 2004
Literary awards honoring writers